The British Alpine Hannibal Expedition was an experimental archeology event that took place in 1959. British engineer John Hoyte led an expedition that tried to reenact aspects of Hannibal's legendary crossing of the Alps during the Second Punic War in 218 BCE. The group successfully took the female Asian elephant Jumbo, provided by a zoo in Turin, from France over the Col du Mont Cenis into Italy.

Background 

After the Carthaginian defeat in the First Punic War of 264–241 BCE, Hamilcar Barca secured an extensive territory in the Iberian peninsula for Carthage. At the beginning of the Second Punic War in 218 BCE, his son Hannibal took an army of perhaps 50,000 men and 37 war elephants from Hispania (modern-day Spain) to Italy, where he led a 15-year campaign against Rome. Hannibal avoided the coastal route, and took his army over the Alps. His march has been described by ancient historians Polybius and Livy. The exact route, however, has been subject of long but inconclusive scholarly discourse. In his 1955  book Alps and elephants: Hannibal's march, Gavin de Beer lists 12 possible candidates from 30 different books.

The expedition 

In 1955, The Times published a debate about the route Hannibal might have taken over the Alps. This debate came to the attention of  John Hoyte, then an engineering student at Cambridge University. Hoyte had an interest in both history and mountain climbing, and spent the summer of 1956 with friends hiking the Alps and comparing possible routes to the ancient descriptions. The group came to the conclusion that the Col de Clapier was the most likely pass, an opinion still supported by some modern historians.

A few years later, a friend suggested testing this theory with an actual elephant. Hoyte wrote letters to the British consuls in Lyon, France, Geneva, Switzerland, and Turin, enquiring about the possibility of obtaining an elephant for the experiment, but without a serious expectation of success. However, the Turin Zoo had just acquired a female Asian elephant, Jumbo, who was trained as a circus animal. The owner of the zoo volunteered Jumbo and became the first sponsor of the expedition.  Hoyte put together a team of 8 people, including Richard Jolly as the expedition secretary and Colonel John Hickman, Lecturer (later Reader) in Veterinary Surgery at the University of Cambridge Veterinary School, who had gained experience with elephants during World War II in Burma. The group obtained insurance for Jumbo from Lloyd's of London and further sponsorship from Life magazine, which later published a 7-page photo report.

The expedition started in late July 1959 in Montmelian, France. It followed the valley of the Arc river and then ascended towards the Col de Clapier. However, the route up to the pass had become narrowed and dangerous due to rockfall. The group retreated down into the valley and crossed the Col du Mont Cenis, another pass suggested for Hannibal's route by none less than French emperor Napoleon. After 10 days of travel, the expedition successfully "invaded" Susa in Italy.

The members of the expedition originally planned to call the 5,700 pound (2.6 t) elephant Hannibella, however, the animal could not be made to respond to the new name and thus remained Jumbo. Jumbo was 11 years old and equipped with leather boots and knee pads for the most treacherous passages. A specially made coat was provided to keep her warm. On arrival in Italy, she consumed cake and a Magnum bottle of Chianti.

In 1960, Hoyte published a report on the expedition as Trunk Road for Hannibal: With an Elephant Over the Alps. Expedition member Cynthia Pilkington published the book "Elephant Over the Alps" in 1961, telling the story of the expedition.

References

External links 

 The Stanford University course Hannibal by Patrick Hunt - Episode 7 features John Hoyte narrating the story in 2007.
 A picture of John Hoyte on Jumbo can be found in 
 The Elephant Boot at the BBC/The British Museum A History of the World depicts one of the boots made for Jumbo.

European expeditions
1959 in the United Kingdom
1959 in France
1959 in Italy
Experimental archaeology
Expeditions from the United Kingdom